William Waldo may refer to:

 William Waldo (California politician) (1812–1881)
 William Waldo (Oregon politician) (1832–1911)